The 1987 European Curling Championships were held from 8 to 12 December at the Eis-Bundesleistungs-Zentrum arena in Oberstdorf, West Germany.

The Swedish men's team skipped by Thomas Norgren won their second title and the West German women's team skipped by Andrea Schöpp won their third title.

Men

Teams

First Phase (Triple Knockout)

Round 1
Two teams promoted to Second Phase

Round 2
Three teams promoted to Second Phase

Round 3
Three teams promoted to Second Phase

Second Phase (Double Knockout)

Round 1
Two teams promoted to Playoffs

Round 2
Two teams promoted to Playoffs

Placement Phase

Range 9-14

Range 5-8

Playoffs

Final standings

Women

Teams

First Phase (Triple Knockout)

Round 1
Two teams promoted to Second Phase

Round 2
Three teams promoted to Second Phase

Round 3
Three teams promoted to Second Phase

Second Phase (Double Knockout)

Round 1
Two teams promoted to Playoffs

Round 2
Two teams promoted to Playoffs

Placement Phase

Range 9-13

Range 5-8

Playoffs

Final standings

References

European Curling Championships, 1987
European Curling Championships, 1987
European Curling Championships
International curling competitions hosted by Germany
December 1987 sports events in Europe
1987 European Curling Championships